Two Gun Law is a 1937 American Western film directed by Leon Barsha, starring Charles Starrett and Peggy Stratford.

Cast
 Charles Starrett as Bob Larson
 Peggy Stratford as Mary Hammond
 Hank Bell as Cookie
 Edward J. Le Saint as Ben Hammond
 Charles Middleton as Wolf Larson
 Alan Bridge as Kipp Faulkner
 Lee Prather as Sheriff Bill Collier
 Dick Curtis as Len Edwards
 Victor Potel as Cassius
 Art Mix as Cullen
 George Chesebro as Blair
 Edmund Cobb as Catlin
 Jack Rockwell as Bledsoe
 Hal Taliaferro as Cattle buyer
 Lee Shumway as Bartender

References

American Western (genre) films
American black-and-white films
Films directed by Leon Barsha
1930s American films